Miss Universe Albania is a national beauty pageant in Albania. The pageant was founded as Miss Albania in 2002, until rebranding as Miss Universe Albania in 2006. Since 2021, winners of the competition have competed internationally in Miss Universe, Miss Earth and Miss World.

History
The beauty pageants in Albania are run by two different organizers: Vera Grabocka organized the Miss Albania competition since 1991, while Petri Bozo and his Deliart Association organize the Miss Shqiperia election. Politically, Petri Bozo is close to the Socialist Party, Vera Grabocka to the Democratic Party. The finalists take part in the Miss Europe election, and since 2002 also for Miss World and Miss Universe.

Albanian women from Kosovo can also take part in the Miss Albania competition: Venera Mustafa became Miss Kosovo and Miss Albania in 1999. In the same year she took part in the Miss Europe election for Albania. Agnesa Vuthaj was elected Miss Kosovo in 2003 and Miss Albania in 2004 and was a candidate for Miss World in 2004 and Miss Universe in 2005.

Miss Universe Albania was created in 2002 to determine the participant for the international Miss Universe competition.

Albania debuted at Miss Universe in 2002 with the Miss Albania organization as the official franchise holder. The organization held national pageant yearly up into 2006. Beginning in 2007, the franchise license was given to the then official photographer of Miss Universe, Fadil Berisha who happened to be from Albania. At this point Fadil created the "Miss Universe Albania" organization and would held occasional yearly national pageant or in some cases, designate a participant to represent Albania at Miss Universe. Fadil would continue to be the national director until 2013.

Since 2005, Enkeleid Omi and his agency Alba-Media have organized the competition for Miss Earth Albania (formerly Miss Shqiptarja), the winners of which take part in Miss Earth. Here too, Albanians from Kosovo have been able to stand for candidacy so far: The 2007 winner, Shpresa Vitia, comes from there

In 2014 Eduart Deda acquired the Miss Universe franchise license in Albania and in Kosovo from 2018. The company would held yearly national pageants where two winners were crowned to compete at Miss Universe and Miss World until 2017.

Titleholders

Wins by municipality

Titleholders under the Miss Universe Albania Organization

Miss Universe Albania 

Since 2006, the winner of Miss Universe Albania has been sent to Miss Universe. Prior, either a winner of Miss Albania was sent to Miss Universe.

Miss World Albania

The 1st Runner-up or second position (another contestant) at Miss Universe Albania or designation will be representing Albania at Miss World.

Miss Earth Albania 

Began in 2021 Miss Universe Albania took the Miss Earth franchise and the third winner or 2nd Runner-up will be representing Albania at Miss Earth.

Gallery of winners

See also
 Miss Universe Kosovo
 Miss Earth Albania

References

External links

Albania
Albania
Recurring events established in 2002
2002 establishments in Albania
Albanian awards